Jillian: Namamasko Po! (International title: Jillian, The Christmas Doll /  ) is a Philippine television drama comedy series broadcast by GMA Network. It stars Jillian Ward in the title role. It premiered on November 29, 2010 on the network's Telebabad line up. On January 13, 2011, the show was renamed as Jillian. The series concluded on January 21, 2011 with a total of 40 episodes. It was replaced by Machete in its timeslot.

Cast and characters

Lead cast
 Jillian Ward as Jillian The Doll

Supporting cast
 Claudine Barretto as Lynette "Lynn" Rivera
 Wendell Ramos as Nelson Rivera

Guest cast
 Michael V. as Santa Claus / Nick
 Daniella Amable as Dolly Rivera
 Marian Rivera as Odessa Fuentes
 Yul Servo as Roberto
 Sherilyn Reyes as Carmen
 Chinggoy Alonzo as Victor
 Diva Montelaba as Sarah
 Carla Abellana as Joyce
 Nathalie Hart as Maya
 Gabby Eigenmann as Andre
 Danica Robles as Meding
 Sunshine Garcia as Andre's wife
 Paulo Avelino as James
 Enzo Pineda as Ace
 Dennis Trillo as Danny
 Jennylyn Mercado as Cecile
 Tirso Cruz III as R
 Yogo Singh as Habagat
 Ryan Eigenmann as Rico
 Arthur Solinap as himself
 Christopher de Leon as Dante Molina
 Sam Pinto as Lissa Molina
 Mark Herras as Bart Molina
 Barbie Forteza as Maggie Molina
 Eddie Garcia as Zaldy
 Luz Valdez as Virgie
 Neil Coleta as Junior
 Bernadette Alysson as Minnie
 Ian Veneracion as Migs
 Maureen Larrazabal as Lizzie
 Ynna Asistio as Jenny
 Buboy Villar
Carlo Gonzales as Franco
 Nova Villa as Claus
 Diana Zubiri as Francine
 Grecila Rosales as Kate
 Chynna Ortaleza as Mavic
 Kiko Rustia as Noel
 Diego Llorico as Francine's friend

Ratings
According to AGB Nielsen Philippines' Mega Manila People/Individual television ratings, the pilot episode of Jillian: Namamasko Po earned a 10.7% rating, while the final episode scored an 11.8% rating.

References

External links
 

2010 Philippine television series debuts
2011 Philippine television series endings
Christmas television series
Fantasy television series
Filipino-language television shows
GMA Network drama series
Television shows set in the Philippines